Big Grrrl Small World (sometimes stylized as Big GRRRL Small World) is the second studio album by American singer and rapper Lizzo. It was released on her own record label BGSW on December 11, 2015. The album received "generally favorable reviews" from critics.

Production
As soon as her debut studio album Lizzobangers was released in 2013, Lizzo started writing new songs. She made at least 25 demos that didn't end up on Big Grrrl Small World. The oldest song on the album is "The Fade".

In 2014, Lizzo participated in StyleLikeU's What's Underneath project, where she removed her clothes as she talked about her relationships with her body. Inspired by the experience, she wrote "My Skin", which she described as "the thesis statement of the album". In a 2015 interview with Vice, she said: "You can wake up and change many things about your appearance, but the inevitability of waking up in your skin is what unifies us."

The recording of the album took place at Justin Vernon's April Base Studios in Fall Creek, Wisconsin.

Release
The album was released on BGSW on December 11, 2015. In 2019, the album was removed from all streaming services and digital retailers, to aid in Lizzo's campaign for Best New Artist at the 62nd Annual Grammy Awards.

Music videos
Music videos were created for "My Skin" and "Humanize". Paste placed the video for "My Skin" at number 8 on the "25 Best Music Videos of 2015" list.

Critical reception

At Metacritic, which assigns a weighted average score out of 100 to reviews from mainstream critics, the album received an average score of 79, based on 10 reviews, indicating "generally favorable reviews."

Alexis Petridis of The Guardian gave the album 4 stars out of 5, saying, "the album's tracks display a marked tendency to end up in an entirely different place from where they started, helped by the fact that Lizzo is as strong a vocalist as she is a rapper." Hilary Saunders of Paste gave the album an 8.2 out of 10, praising Lizzo's "ability to rap and sing with equal tenacity." Andrea Swensson of The Current wrote: "There's an old feminist adage that says that the personal is political, and Lizzo seems to understand this concept intrinsically."

Star Tribune placed the album at number 3 on the "Twin Cities Critics Tally 2015" list. Spin placed it at number 17 on the "50 Best Hip-Hop Albums of 2015" list.

Track listing
All tracks written by  Melissa "Lizzo" Jefferson.

Personnel
Credits adapted from the 2015 CD edition's liner notes.

 Lizzo – vocals, flute
 BJ Burton – production (1, 2, 3, 4, 5, 8, 9), executive production, vocals, vocoder, guitar, synthesizer, drum programming
 Sam Spiegel – production (1)
 Jake Troth – production (1)
 Lazerbeak – production (3), drum programming
 Stefon "Bionik" Taylor – production (6, 10, 11, 12), turntables, guitar, synthesizer, drum programming
 Taskforce – production (7), drum programming
 Sophia Eris – vocals
 Claire Monesterio – vocals
 Quinn Wilson – vocals
 Eric Mayson – vocals, piano, synthesizer
 Justin Vernon – vocoder, synthesizer
 Francis Starlite – synthesizer, drum programming
 Ryan Olson – synthesizer
 Nelson Devereaux – saxophone
 Ben Lester – pedal steel guitar
 James Buckley – upright bass, bass guitar
 Joey Van Phillips – drums
 Huntley Miller – mastering

References

External links
 
 

2015 albums
Lizzo albums
Albums produced by BJ Burton
Albums produced by Lazerbeak
Albums produced by Sam Spiegel (musician)
Hip hop albums by American artists